Brandau may refer to:

 Brandau, district in Modautal
 Brandau (surname)
 Brandau Crater, volcano
 Brandau Glacier, glacier
 Brandau Rocks, rock formation
 Brandov, a village in the Czech Republic